Thorogood as a surname may refer to:

Alison Thorogood, British sprint canoer
George Thorogood, American blues rock musician
Ian Thorogood, Australian footballer
Jack Thorogood, English footballer
Martina Thorogood, Venezuelan beauty queen
Robert Thorogood, English screenwriter
Tim Thorogood, Chief Executive of the Falkland Islands